A mandoca is a Venezuelan deep fried cornmeal ring that is usually eaten with butter, cheese and coffee while still hot. It is usually served at breakfast, and it is most popular in Zulia state of the country. The mandoca is one of a variety of specialties exclusively created in the western state of Zulia. 

Though their relevance has been shaded by the new transnational tendencies because its creation was not intended for massive consumption or for marketing, it remains a basic and important part of the culinary culture of Zulia. It is made of corn meal, water, salt, grated "queso blanco" (hard, salty, white cheese), sugar or panela (jaggery, used in most traditional recipes), and very ripe plantain.

See also 

 Aborrajados de plátano maduro

References

Venezuelan cuisine
Breads
Maize dishes

Plantain dishes